The Times is an Australian midweek current affairs program hosted by Paul Barry that was broadcast on the Seven Network. It aired from March 1994 until November 1995.

Overview
It began in March 1994 airing late night on Wednesdays, and included regular contributions from Neil Mercer, and Seven's senior Canberra reporter, Glenn Milne. The program later moved to Sunday nights where it would screen after the Sunday night movie, and then in August 1995 it moved to Tuesday nights.

Unlike most current affairs programs, The Times made heavy use of short cuts, subtitles and fast-paced music, resulting in an energetic style aimed at younger viewers.

It was axed in November 1995, but the program's staff moved on to work on the new 10:30 pm news bulletin hosted by Anne Fulwood.

See also
 List of Australian television series

External links
The Times at the National Film and Sound Archive

1994 Australian television series debuts
1995 Australian television series endings
Australian non-fiction television series
Seven Network original programming